Günther Senftleben (1925–1982) was a German cinematographer.

Selected filmography
 Request Concert (1955)
 A Piece of Heaven (1957)
 Peter Voss, Thief of Millions (1958)
 People in the Net (1959)
 Adorable Arabella (1959)
 Jacqueline (1959)
 Brainwashed (1960)
 Ingeborg (1960)
 The Woman by the Dark Window (1960)
 Agatha, Stop That Murdering! (1960)
 Question 7 (1961)
 The Dream of Lieschen Mueller (1961)
 Captain Sindbad (1963)
 Don't Tell Me Any Stories (1964)
 Maya (1966)

References

Bibliography 
 Esther Pia Wipfler. Martin Luther in Motion Pictures: History of a Metamorphosis. Vandenhoeck & Ruprecht, 2011.

External links 
 

1925 births
1982 deaths
People from Büdingen
German cinematographers
Film people from Hesse